H. Hanumanthappa is an Indian politician. He was a Member of Parliament, representing Karnataka in the Rajya Sabha, the upper house of India's Parliament, as a member of the Indian National Congress.

References

Rajya Sabha members from Karnataka
Indian National Congress politicians
1932 births
Living people